Jade Gatt (born 3 April 1978) is an Australian actor who appeared in TV commercials, films and TV shows, and has hosted many Australian TV specials.

Gatt starred in the ABC's Swap Shop in 1990, and in 1994 was cast as Bradley in the pilot for The Bastards Next Door. Other roles in TV include parts in Heartbreak High and Home and Away.

In 1995 he began hosting the morning cartoon show Cheez TV for Network Ten, and in 1997 made his film debut in Blackrock. Later that year he started hosting the late-night music program Ground Zero but was released from the show in July 1998.  On 31 December 2004, Gatt and Ryan Lappin finished presenting the children's show Cheez TV, but still continued to air without presenters until 20 August 2005.

Gatt and his former Cheez TV co-host Lappin were special guests at AVCon in 2011, which ran from 22 to 24 July for that year. AVCon is an anime and video games convention that is held yearly in Adelaide, South Australia, during July.

On 14 February 2016, Gatt and his former Cheez TV co-host Ryan Lappin launched a podcast called "The Jade & Ryan Show", which was put on hiatus in 2017.

References

http://www.nvrsphr.com.au/2017/09/watch-barcading-cheez-tv/

External links

Living people
Australian male television actors
1978 births